Emission is the radiation or radio signal produced or emitted by a radio transmitting station.

References

Radio